The Sheila McKechnie Foundation (SMK) is a charity based in the United Kingdom. The foundation is a type of civil society campaign. It was founded in 2005 to support new and inexperienced campaigners, and to champion the right to campaign, offering experience and resources to bring the campaign community together.

History
The charity was established following the death in 2004 of Sheila McKechnie, an influential and well-established campaigner, who had fought for such initiatives as the Financial Services Authority, the Food Standards Agency and the Freedom of Information Act. Currently, the staff at the foundation have experience in numerous sectors including torts, education and development.

SMK National Campaigner Awards
In conjunction with the Joseph Rowntree Reform Trust, the foundation runs the SMK National Campaigner Awards, an annual awards programme, and provides support, advice and a place to share information on key areas of effective campaigning: including strategy, tactics, and targets to evaluating successful campaigns. Categories for the SMK awards include: Best Digital Campaign; Best Use of Law; Best Consumer Campaign; Best Coalition; Amplifying Voices Award; Best Community Campaign; David & Goliath; Young Person's Award; Outstanding Leadership Award; Long-term Achievement Award.

Further reading 
 Esther Foreman, Jim Coe, "What’s so good about campaigning?", Civil Society Futures.

References

External links
 Official website

Charities based in the United Kingdom